Jessica-Bianca Wessolly (born 11 December 1996 in Mannheim) is a German sprinter. She won a silver medal in the 200 metres at the 2019 Summer Universiade and has been the European Champion with the German 4 × 100 metres relay team since 2022.

International competitions

1Did not start in the semi-final
2Starts only in Round 1 / Heat 2 (43.33 Q); competitors who run in the qualifying rounds, but not in the final, will also receive the medal as part of the team
Abbreviations: h = heat (Q, q), sf = semi-final

Personal bests
Outdoor
100 metres – 11.36 (+0.6 m/s, Mannheim 2019)
200 metres – 22.89 (-0.6 m/s, Nürnberg 2018)
Indoor
60 metres – 7.55 (Karlsruhe 2019)
200 metres – 23.33 (Leipzig 2019)

References

External links

1996 births
Living people
Sportspeople from Mannheim
German female sprinters
Universiade silver medalists for Germany
Universiade medalists in athletics (track and field)
Medalists at the 2019 Summer Universiade
World Athletics Championships athletes for Germany
German national athletics champions
MTG Mannheim athletes
Athletes (track and field) at the 2020 Summer Olympics
Olympic female sprinters
Olympic athletes of Germany
European Athletics Championships winners